York—Scarborough was a federal electoral district represented in the House of Commons of Canada from 1953 to 1988. It was located in the province of Ontario. In the twelve general elections held during York—Scarborough's existence, the party that won here also won the election.

Initially, it included the southern part of York County, Ontario, being now the northern part of Scarborough and parts of North York and Markham. The riding was created in 1952 from parts of York East and York North ridings.

In 1966, it was redefined to lie entirely within the Municipality of Metropolitan Toronto and consisted of the eastern part of the Borough of North York and the north-western part of the Borough of Scarborough. In 1976 (with effect from the 1979 general election), the riding was shifted to the east, taking in only the easternmost part of North York, and all of northern Scarborough.  The electoral district was abolished in 1987 (with effect from the 1988 general election) when it was redistributed between Don Valley North, Scarborough—Agincourt and Scarborough—Rouge River ridings.

Members of Parliament

This riding has elected the following Members of Parliament:

Electoral history

|-
  
|Liberal
|Frank Enfield 
|align="right"| 14,889 
  
|Progressive Conservative
|Stanley Nelson Schatz
|align="right"|14,221    
 
|Co-operative Commonwealth
|Arthur Raynard Elliott
|align="right"|  4,184 

|}

|-
  
|Progressive Conservative
|Frank Charles McGee
|align="right"| 42,299   
  
|Liberal
|Frank A. Enfield 
|align="right"|22,353 
 
|Co-operative Commonwealth
|Elva Reta Sigen
|align="right"| 8,931 

|}

|-
  
|Progressive Conservative
|Frank Charles McGee
|align="right"| 57,396    
  
|Liberal
|Frank A. Enfield 
|align="right"|22,019
 
|Co-operative Commonwealth
|Elva R. Sigen
|align="right"| 8,123 

|}

|-
  
|Progressive Conservative
|Frank Charles McGee
|align="right"| 49,643 
  
|Liberal
|Maurice Moreau
|align="right"|44,349 
 
|New Democratic
|Edward G. Phillips
|align="right"|26,819 
 
|Unknown
|E. Shipley Birrell
|align="right"| 1,452  
|}

|-
  
|Liberal
|Maurice Moreau
|align="right"|63,049 
  
|Progressive Conservative
|Frank Charles McGee
|align="right"| 41,535 
 
|New Democratic
|Edward G. Phillips 
|align="right"|26,819

|}

|-
  
|Liberal
|Robert Stanbury 
|align="right"|58,501 
  
|Progressive Conservative
|Frank Charles McGee
|align="right"|54,659 
 
|New Democratic
|Edward G. Phillips
|align="right"| 33,821 
 
|New Capitalist
|Frank O'Hearn 
|align="right"|600   
|}

|-
  
|Liberal
|Robert Stanbury  
|align="right"|37,374 
  
|Progressive Conservative
|Alan Milliken Heisey Sr.
|align="right"| 15,458 
 
|New Democratic
|W. E. Ted Mann
|align="right"|10,724    
|}

|-
  
|Liberal
|Robert Stanbury
|align="right"| 39,219 
  
|Progressive Conservative
|Winnett Boyd
|align="right"| 37,368 
 
|New Democratic
|David William Warner
|align="right"|16,584   
|}

|-
  
|Liberal
|Robert Stanbury
|align="right"|47,450
  
|Progressive Conservative
|Ron Collister
|align="right"|38,711 
 
|New Democratic
|David William Warner
|align="right"|11,552 
 
|Independent
|Paul R. Mollon
|align="right"| 274 

 
|Independent
|Arthur Wright
|align="right"| 140  
|}

|-
  
|Progressive Conservative
|Paul McCrossan
|align="right"|55,455
  
|Liberal
|Paul Cosgrove   
|align="right"|21,431
 
|New Democratic
|Ivan H. Jones
|align="right"|7,681 
 
|No affiliation
|Anne C. McBride 
|align="right"| 564   
 
|Independent
|Nick Moldovanyi 
|align="right"|348 
|}

|-
  
|Progressive Conservative
|Paul McCrossan  
|align="right"|36,718   
  
|Liberal
|Paul Cosgrove  
|align="right"|32,699
 
|New Democratic
|Frank Lowery 
|align="right"|10,978 

 
|Independent
|Anne C. McBride  
|align="right"| 242 

|}

|-
  
|Liberal
|Paul Cosgrove 
|align="right"|39,208 
  
|Progressive Conservative
|Paul McCrossan
|align="right"| 30,925 
 
|New Democratic
|Vinc Overend
|align="right"| 10,939
 
|Independent
|Anne C. McBride 
|align="right"| 384 

|}

|-
  
|Progressive Conservative
|Paul McCrossan  
|align="right"| 48,809  
  
|Liberal
|June Rowlands
|align="right"|35,869 
 
|New Democratic
|Yvonne Bondarchuk 
|align="right"| 13,260 

 
|Independent
|Anne C. McBride 
|align="right"|704   
 
|Independent
|Dona Cauchon
|align="right"|666    
|}

See also 

 List of Canadian federal electoral districts
 Past Canadian electoral districts

External links 

 Website of the Parliament of Canada

Former federal electoral districts of Ontario
Federal electoral districts of Toronto